The United Christian Forum for Human Rights (UCFHR) is an inter-denominational Christian organization in India that fights for the human rights of members of the Christian minority, mainly through protest.

Leaders

Alan Basil de Lastic

Alan Basil de Lastic, formerly Archbishop of Delhi, was instrumental in bringing members of most Christian denominations into the organization, and served as President.
de Lastic announced a National Protest Day on 4 December 1998 to draw attention to the continued attacks on the Christian community.  
In September 1999 Archbishop Alan de Lastic and UCFHR National Convenor John Dayal protested to Prime Minister Atal Bihari Vajpayee over an ongoing terror campaign against the Orissa Christian community after Roman Catholic Priest Arul Doss had been brutally killed.

John Dayal

John Dayal also played a key role in formation of the UCFHR and was National Convenor.
In September 1999 Human Rights Watch quoted Dayal as saying of the attacks "Dalits and tribals are used as instruments.  They are paid, drugged, alcoholized, they are in a stupor".
In September 2000 U.S. President Bill Clinton welcomed Indian Prime Minister Atal Bihari Vajpayee to the White House.  
In New York John Dayal and Bernard Chand, president of the International Council of Evangelical Churches, held a briefing hosted by Human Rights Watch on religious persecution of India’s Christian minority.

Activities

In June 2000 the New Delhi-based UCFHR said it had identified 129 attacks in the past year against Christian churches, schools and individuals. Officials of the Indian government denied any involvement in the attacks.
After a renewed surge of violence against Muslims and Christians in June 2005 John Dayal asked that a proposed constitutional review should consider the increased violence against minorities who are living in "an atmosphere of hatred".
In 2009 the Gujarat United Christian Forum for Human Rights challenged the state's Freedom of Religion Act 2003 on the basis that it violated the constitutional right of individuals to choose their religion. The act had required a person who had decided to convert to a different religion to seek prior permission from a district magistrate.

The Karnataka United Christian Forum for Human Rights (KUCFHR) was formed in September 2008 after attacks were launched on Christian Churches across Karnataka.
In December 2009 priests and pastors from several Christian denominations participated at an ecumenical meeting organized by KUCFHR at St. Marks Cathedral in Bangalore.
Attendees discussed recent allegations of forced conversions to Christianity, and an attempt by the government to introduce an anti-conversion bill.
After the attacks of 2008 and 2009, the KUCFHR began making representations to the Government every time incidents were reported from anywhere in the state.

In February 2011 the Karnataka United Christian Forum for Human Rights and the Karnataka Region Catholic Bishops' Council staged a sit-in protest over the findings from an investigation of a series of attack in September 2008 on Christian targets in southern Karnataka state.  The report had failed to identify the attackers in 57 incidents involving Christian churches and other sites.
Speaking at the KUCFHR meeting Rev. Bernad Moras said: "Let us not be intimidated by any threats or attacks, let us boldly profess, practise and propagate our faith".
In August 2011 Fr Ronnie Prabhu, general secretary of the Karnataka United Christian Forum for Human Rights, reported that police had been calling on local clergymen saying they must register their prayer houses at the local police station.  They were told that if they did not do so their meetings would be illegal and the police would not protect them.

References

Christian organisations based in India
Human rights organisations based in India